Thévenot is a surname. Notable people with the surname include:

 Jean de Thévenot (1633–1667), French traveller, nephew of Melchisédech Thévenot
 Laurent Thévenot (born 1949), French sociologist
 Melchisédech Thévenot (1620–1692), French scientist and traveller
Pascal Thévenot (born 1966), French politician

Surnames
Surnames of French origin
French-language surnames